George Green (July 16, 1840 – February 10, 1898) was an American soldier who fought in the American Civil War. Green received his country's highest award for bravery during combat, the Medal of Honor. Green's medal was won for his actions in the Battle of Missionary Ridge, Chattanooga, Tennessee, on November 25, 1863. He was honored with the award on January 12, 1892.

Green was born in Elsham, Lincolnshire, England. He joined the US Army from Columbus, Ohio in April 1861, and mustered out with his regiment in June 1864. He was buried in Troy, Ohio.

Medal of Honor citation

See also
List of American Civil War Medal of Honor recipients: G–L

References

External links
 

1840 births
1898 deaths
American Civil War recipients of the Medal of Honor
Burials in Ohio
English-born Medal of Honor recipients
English emigrants to the United States
People from Elsham, North Lincolnshire
People of Ohio in the American Civil War
Union Army officers
United States Army Medal of Honor recipients